Miroslav Despotović (born January 1, 1983) is a Macedonian professional basketball Power forward who last played for Lirija.

References

External links
 Miroslav Despotovic Player Profile, KK Lirija Skopje, News, Stats - Eurobasket
  
  

1983 births
Living people
Macedonian men's basketball players
Sportspeople from Skopje
Power forwards (basketball)
Macedonian people of Serbian descent
KK MZT Skopje players
KK Vardar players